Allan Clay McBride (June 30, 1885 – May 9, 1944) was an American brigadier general and chief of staff in the Philippines at the time of the Japanese invasion. He died of starvation in a Japanese prisoner-of-war camp on Formosa.

In 1908, McBride earned an A.B. degree from St. John's Military College in Annapolis, Maryland. He was commissioned as a second lieutenant of field artillery in September 1908. During World War I, McBride served as a battalion commander in France and received a temporary promotion to lieutenant colonel.

After the war, McBride graduated from the Command and General Staff School in 1923 and the Army War College in 1926. He was promoted to lieutenant colonel in January 1933 and colonel in September 1937.

Sent to the Philippines in February 1941, McBride received a temporary promotion to brigadier general in December 1941. He was captured by Japanese forces at Bataan in April 1942 and awarded the Distinguished Service Medal in November 1942. McBride died after over two years as a prisoner of war. He was posthumously awarded the Silver Star for his bravery during harsh interrogation after capture.

After the war, his remains were exhumed from Taiwan in 1947, transferred to Hawaii and then reburied at Mount Olivet Cemetery in Frederick, Maryland on May 25, 1948.

References

External links
Spotlight: Allan C. McBride, Chief of Staff of the American Forces on Bataan
Generals of World War II

1885 births
1944 deaths
People from Frederick, Maryland
St. John's College (Annapolis/Santa Fe) alumni
Military personnel from Maryland
United States Army personnel of World War I
United States Army Command and General Staff College alumni
United States Army War College alumni
United States Army generals of World War II
American prisoners of war in World War II
World War II prisoners of war held by Japan
Recipients of the Silver Star
Bataan Death March prisoners
Recipients of the Soldier's Medal
Recipients of the Distinguished Service Medal (US Army)
United States Army personnel killed in World War II
United States Army generals
Burials at Mount Olivet Cemetery (Frederick, Maryland)